SRB or Srb may refer to:

Places
 Serbia (ISO 3166-1 alpha-3 country code SRB), a country in Central/Southeastern Europe 
 Srb, a village in Croatia

Organizations
 State Research Bureau (organisation), former Ugandan intelligence agency
 Single Resolution Board, EU banking authority

Science and technology
 Storage Resource Broker, a computer data grid management system
 Sulfate-reducing bacteria
 Sulfur-reducing bacteria
 Service Request Block, in IBM operating systems
 Solid rocket booster
 SRb, a subtype of semiregular variable star

Other uses
 Sonic's Rendezvous Band, Ann Arbor, Michigan, US
 Daniel Srb (born 1964), Croatian politician
 Sora language (ISO 639-3 code srb), a Munda language of India